Bruce Kenneth Farr  (born 1949 in Auckland) is a New Zealand designer of racing and cruising yachts.  Farrdesigned boats have won, challenged for, or placed highly in the Whitbread Round the World Race, America's Cup, and Sydney to Hobart Yacht Race, among others.

Farr's services to yacht design were recognised in the 1990 Queen's Birthday Honours, when he was appointed an Officer of the Order of the British Empire. He currently lives near Annapolis, Maryland, USA.

Early boats
Farr began building boats at the age of 13 near Warkworth north of Auckland. His first boats were plywood hard chine Moth class designs. He later designed and built variants of Cherubs and especially Flying 18s. His early designs were built in plywood with a focus on light weight and good planing shapes. By his late teens he was designing small lightweight keel boats that were successful on the race course.

He first achieved acclaim as a sailboat designer in the highly competitive 18ft Skiff class, popular in Australia and New Zealand. Farr designs won the 18 ft Skiff Giltinan World title several times in the early 70s.

Ocean racing 
Boats designed by Farr Yacht Design competed in every Whitbread Round the World Race after 1981, and won the 1986, 1990, 1994 and 1998 races. 
The first Bruce Farr yacht in the Whitbread Race was the Farr-designed Ceramco New Zealand, which competed in the 1980 Whitbread Race and won the Sydney to Hobart the same year. Farr's design proved exceedingly fast, and Ceramco New Zealand would have won the Round the World Race, save for an unfortunate dismasting on the first leg, a trans-Atlantic crossing. The deltas for the rest of the legs would have put Ceramco New Zealand 30 hours ahead of her next competitor. This yacht was helmed and captained by New Zealand's most famous yachtsman Sir Peter Blake.

Farr designed the 58-foot yacht which came to be known as Maiden, with the first all-female crew in the 1989–90 Whitbread Round the World Race, skippered by Tracy Edwards MBE. The yacht had previously been skippered by South African Bertie Reed in the 1986-87 BOC single-handed challenge. Maiden is still active in 2018.

In 2001 the event was renamed the Volvo Ocean Race. The Farr Yacht Design-designed Illbruck Challenge was victorious in 2002.  Farr's Volvo Ocean Race boats fared less well in 2006 as all four of his designs experienced problems after various failures in their Farr-designed keel canting mechanisms, including an abandonment of the yacht Movistar which was unable to prevent the flow of water through the keel box and, to this day, lies on the ocean floor, unrecovered.

Farr's Volvo Ocean 65 was the first ever One-Design selected for the Volvo Ocean Race, for the 2014-15 race, and again in the 2017-18 edition.

Farr is the most successful designer of winners of the Sydney to Hobart Yacht Race, having designed 15 overall winners between 1945 and 2003.

Cookson Boatworks developed a new 50' design, using the Farr office to collaborate, called the Cookson 50.
Irish-owned yacht Chieftain, conceived, developed and constructed in 2005 at Cookson's in New Zealand, was the overall winner of the 2007 Rolex Fastnet race. Shortly after it was launched, Chieftain finished 5th at Australia's Hamilton Island Race Week, then won class in the 2005 Rolex Sydney to Hobart Yacht Race.

Chieftain competed in all of the 2006 season Royal Ocean Racing Club races and won class in the Round Ireland, won overall in Round Britain and Ireland Races, was awarded Boat of the Year in Ireland in 2006, and finished as the overall winner of the Rolex Fastnet Race.

America's Cup 
Farr is also a designer of America's Cup competitors, including New Zealand's entries in 1986 (co-designed with Ron Holland and Laurie Davidson) and 2000, and Larry Ellison's United States's BMW Oracle Racing Challenger in 2003 (accepted as Challenger of Record for the 2007 Cup). Farr's design Young America (USA-36) proved faster than the other American sailed yachts, but was unsuccessful in defending the Cup in the 1995 Finals, losing 0–5 to a Davidson designed Black Magic of New Zealand, led by the late Sir Peter Blake.

Among the most impressive of Farr's design boats was the 90-foot-long KZ-1, the Michael Fay-sponsored boat brought forth to challenge the San Diego Yacht Club immediately following their gaining the cup in 1987. The challenge was unusual in that it did not allow the host yacht club the conventional three to four years to prepare for the event, nor did the challenging boat adhere to the 12-metre class design that the America's Cup had been contested in for thirty-five years, nor did it allow time for other international challengers and defenders to participate. The unconventional challenge was answered with an unconventional defence, and the entire episode serves as an excellent case study on how the process of yacht racing can be mired in the legal system when America's Cup participants radically depart from the spirit of the rules. Farr sailed on the boat during the 1988 America's Cup.

Cruising yachts 
Farr's cruising yachts have been sold and sailed the world around. His production designs (mass-produced as opposed to custom) have been produced by a variety of yacht manufacturers including Cookson Boats, Carroll Marine, Beneteau, Concordia, Baltic, and Nauta.

Some of the larger cruising luxury yachts Farr has designed include Bavaria, Mirabella, Philanderer, Sojana, and the two Southern Wind-built 100 footers: Farewell and Farandwide.

Designs
 Farr 3.7
 Farr 35
 Farr 38
 Farr 50 Pilot House
 Farr 5000
 Farr 6000
 Farr 7500
 Laser 28
 Farr 1020
 Farr 1220
 Farr 727
 Farr 920
 Farr 1104
 Farr 9.2
 Ceramco NZ
 Steinlager 2
 Fisher & Paykel
 NZ Endeavour
 Noelex 30
 NZI Enterprise
 Jenny H
 Disque D'or
 Farr MRX
 Atlantic Privateer
 UBS Switzerland
 Farr Phase 4
 The Card
 Merit
 Maiden
 Brindabella
 Yamaha
 Intrum Justitia
 Winston
 La Poste
 Merit Cup
 Sun Odyssey 51
 Sun Odyssey 52.2
 Tokio
 Tag Heuer
 Beneteau First 40.7
 Mumm 36
 Ragamuffin
 Beneteau First 42S7
 Sayonara
 Farr 44
 Beneteau First 45F5
 Flash Gordon
 Farr 40
 Cookson 12
Gerontius

See also
 Ron Holland
 Bruce Nelson
 Doug Peterson
 Laurie Davidson
 Greg Elliott
 Juan Kouyoumdjian
 Frank Bethwaite
 Zamazaan (racing sailboat)

Notes

Bibliography

External links
Farr Yacht Design company website
About Bruce Farr
Design list

Bruce Farr
1949 births
Living people
People from Auckland
New Zealand yacht designers
New Zealand Officers of the Order of the British Empire
Boat and ship designers
America's Cup yacht designers
New Zealand expatriates in the United States
1988 America's Cup sailors
People educated at Mahurangi College